Katy apple is a Swedish variety raised in 1947 at Balsgard Fruit Breeding Institute, Sweden.  Parentage is James Grieve and Worcester Pearmain  and it produces heavy crops of bright red fruit. Sugar 12%, acid 8.5 g/litre, vitamin C 6mg/100g.

References

Apple cultivars
Swedish apples